The 2016 Tokyo gubernatorial election took place on 31 July 2016 to elect the successor to Governor Yoichi Masuzoe, who submitted his resignation to the Tokyo Metropolitan Assembly on 15 June 2016. By-elections in four of Tokyo's cities were held on the same day to fill vacancies in the Assembly.

Former Defense Minister Yuriko Koike won the election by a wide margin. Turnout increased sharply to 59% from 46% in the previous election.

Background
Yoichi Masuzoe, a former national Minister of Health, Labour, and Welfare, was elected in the February 2014 election. At the election he was endorsed by the Liberal Democratic Party (LDP) and Komeito and received more than 2.11 million votes, more than double his nearest opponent in the seven-candidate race. He replaced Naoki Inose, who had resigned in the second year of his four-year term due to a political funds scandal.

In May 2016 reports surfaced concerning Masuzoe's misuse of public funds, including the use of his chauffeur-driven government car to travel to and from his holiday house on most weekends. As examination into his spending continued, it was found that he had misused funds to purchase items for personal use, including art, comics, and meals, as well as paying for his family to stay in hotels that were accounted as meeting-related expenses. An independent investigation ultimately determined that he had acted inappropriately but not illegally. Despite this, surveys showed that more than 90% of Tokyo residents were dissatisfied with how he handled the issue and the lack of a clear explanation.

As pressure grew on Masuzoe to resign, a no-confidence motion jointly submitted by all of the parties represented in the Tokyo Metropolitan Assembly was to be put to a vote on the afternoon of 15 June. As the motion was likely to pass and wanting to avoid further disruption to the governing of the city, Masuzoe submitted his resignation to assembly President Shigeo Kawai on the morning of the 15th, to become effective as of 21 June.

Candidates
A total of 21 candidates were nominated for the election. Yuriko Koike, a former Minister of Defence and incumbent member for the Tokyo 10th district in the House of Representatives, announced her candidacy despite not receiving an endorsement from the Liberal Democratic Party. Instead, the LDP (along with Komeito and the Party for Japanese Kokoro) endorsed Hiroya Masuda, who is a former Minister of Internal Affairs and Communications and former governor of Iwate Prefecture. Actor Junichi Ishida was approached by the Democratic Party but ultimately declined to run. Ultimately, the Democratic Party and other opposition parties (including the Communist and Social Democratic parties) endorsed veteran journalist Shuntaro Torigoe. Kenji Utsunomiya, former head of the Japan Federation of Bar Associations and a candidate in the two previous gubernatorial elections, announced his intention to run on 11 July but withdrew two days later.

The Guardian stated that the election "has piqued interest not only because of the size of the task which falls to its victor, but also for the mud slinging and misogyny which has characterised the fight between the candidates." Former Tokyo governor Shintaro Ishihara made disparaging remarks regarding Koike's age and use of makeup, and characterized Torigoe as a "traitor to his country" for questioning Japanese protection of the Senkaku Islands. Torigoe was attacked in a tabloid magazine with allegations that he seduced a 20-year-old university student ten years earlier, in what some viewed as a deliberate smear campaign by his opposition.

Results

References

Tokyo gubernatorial elections
2016 elections in Japan
July 2016 events in Japan
2016 in Tokyo